Jason Lee Childers (born January 13, 1975) is an American former professional baseball relief pitcher.

He is the brother of Matt Childers.

Career
He appeared in only 5 games for the Tampa Bay Devil Rays in 2006. Childers played for the Sultanes de Monterrey of the Mexican League in 2010.

External links

1975 births
Living people
American expatriate baseball players in Canada
American expatriate baseball players in Mexico
Baseball players from Georgia (U.S. state)
Beloit Snappers players
Charlotte Knights players
Durham Bulls players
Edmonton Trappers players
Helena Brewers players
Huntsville Stars players
Indianapolis Indians players
Kennesaw State Owls baseball players
Major League Baseball pitchers
Mexican League baseball pitchers
Mudville Nine players
Naranjeros de Hermosillo players
Ogden Raptors players
People from Statesboro, Georgia
Richmond Braves players
Stockton Ports players
Sultanes de Monterrey players
Tampa Bay Devil Rays players